The V125 class and subsequent H145 subclass, also known as the Großes Torpedoboot Type 1916Mob, were improved versions of the s. They were built with a higher freeboard, which gave them better seakeeping capabilities while retaining good maneuverability.

French service
After the end of World War I, the French Navy acquired five ships of this class as war reparations, becoming the Rageot de la Touche class. The last of the class were decommissioned and scrapped in 1935.

Ships in class
Fourty-four ships were planned for the V125 class with only nineteen ever being completed.

References 

Torpedo boats of the Imperial German Navy
World War I torpedo boats of Germany